Angels of Death is the only studio album by American hip hop duo the Representativz. It was released on October 19, 1999 through Duck Down Records with distribution via Warlock Records. Production was handled by Bucktown USA, Cuzin Bob, Jeff Brown, Shaleek, Smoke, Steele and Supreme. It features guest appearances from Cocoa Brovaz, D. Real of the B.T.J.'s, Niggy Knock, Rock of Heltah Skeltah, Ruste Juxx, Smokelite, and Top Dog of Originoo Gunn Clappaz.

Track listing

Personnel
Brian Perkins – engineering (tracks: 4, 7, 11, 14)
DJ Peter Parker – scratches (track 8)
Drew "Dru-Ha" Friedman – associate executive producer
Kenyatta "Buckshot" Blake – associate executive producer
Leo "Swift" Morris – engineering (tracks: 5, 6, 9, 15)
Sia – assistant engineering

References

External links

1999 debut albums
Duck Down Music albums
Warlock Records albums
Hardcore hip hop albums